Israeli New Zealanders refers to New Zealand citizens or permanent residents who are fully or partially of Israeli descent. There are about 1,353 Israelis in New Zealand. The majority of Israeli New Zealanders are Jewish.

Most Israeli New Zealanders are bilingual in Hebrew and English.

Thousands of Israelis visit New Zealand every summer.

See also

History of the Jews in New Zealand
Israel–New Zealand relations

References

 
Israeli diaspora